Léo Borges may refer to:

 Léo Borges (footballer, born 1985), Brazilian football midfielder
 Léo Borges (footballer, born 2001), Brazilian football left-back for Porto B